Crane Observatory  is an astronomical observatory owned and operated by Washburn University.  It is located in Topeka, Kansas.

See also 
List of observatories

References

External links
 Topeka Clear Sky Clock Forecasts of observing conditions covering Crane Observatory.

Astronomical observatories in Kansas
Buildings and structures in Topeka, Kansas
Washburn University
Tourist attractions in Topeka, Kansas